Madan-e Sofla (also Romanized as Ma‘dan-e Soflá; also known as Ma‘dan-e Pā’īn and Bār Ma‘dan Soflá) is a village in Firuzeh Rural District, in the Central District of Firuzeh County, Razavi Khorasan Province, Iran. At the 2006 census, its population was 516, in 152 families.

References 

Populated places in Firuzeh County